Kireçli can refer to:

 Kireçli, Şavşat
 Kireçli, Şenkaya